Hypatopa cyane is a moth in the family Blastobasidae. It is found in Costa Rica.

The length of the forewings is 4.1–5.1 mm. The forewings are pale brown intermixed with a few brown scales. The hindwings are translucent pale brown, gradually darkening towards the apex.

Etymology
The specific name refers to Cyane, a nymph changed into a fountain for her grief of the loss of Proserpine.

References

Moths described in 2013
Hypatopa